Jerry Lon Litton (May 12, 1937 – August 3, 1976) was an American politician from Missouri who served as a member of the United States House of Representatives representing Missouri's 6th congressional district from 1973 until his death in 1976. A member of the Democratic Party, he ran for United States Senate in 1976. Litton won the Democratic primary, however he died in a plane crash while heading to his victory party.

Early life
Litton was born near Lock Springs, Daviess County, Missouri in a house without electricity. He was national secretary of the Future Farmers of America (1956–1957). He graduated from the University of Missouri in 1961 with a B.S. in Journalism. Litton was president of the University of Missouri Young Democrats and chair of the National Youth for Symington during Stuart Symington's unsuccessful 1960 run for U.S. President.  He served as President of the Theta chapter of the Alpha Gamma Rho fraternity.

Litton made his fortune raising cattle at the Litton Charolais Cattle Ranch in Chillicothe, Missouri.  This ranch was maintained as a beautiful showplace where Litton entertained both the well connected and constituents.  Litton made a point to bring school children and low level local leaders to his home. Before he began his political career, he was active in promoting youth involvement in leadership in agriculture and rural communities. His family (including his parents, Mildred and Charlie Litton) was very prominent in the Charolais cattle business.

U.S. Representative
Litton was elected to the U.S. House as a Democrat in 1972. He was considered a rising star in the Democratic Party and his television show Dialogue with Litton was broadcast statewide.  Among the guests were Jimmy Carter, Secretary of Agriculture Earl Butz, Congressman Tip O'Neill, and House Speaker Carl Albert.

Green bumper stickers (like those used in his prior Congressional campaigns) circulated in the state saying "Litton for President." Jimmy Carter was to say that he thought Litton would be president one day.

1976 U.S. Senate election

In 1976, after only two terms in the House of Representatives, Litton entered into what amounted to a three-way Democratic Party primary race for the U.S. Senate seat of retiring Senator Stuart Symington. The other major contestants were Symington's son James W. Symington and former Missouri Governor Warren Hearnes. Final election results showed Congressman Litton winning with 45.39%, former Governor Warren Hearnes second at 26.38%, and Congressman James Symington finishing third with 25.16% of the statewide vote. Seven other candidates including Kansas City, Missouri Mayor Charles Wheeler split the remaining 4 percent of the vote.

Death
Litton won the primary but died on August 3, 1976, along with his entire family (wife Sharon and their two children, Linda and Scott), pilot Paul Rupp Jr., and the pilot's son, Paul Rupp III, as they departed the airport for a victory party in Kansas City. Their plane, a Beechcraft Model 58 Baron, crashed on take-off from the Chillicothe airport shortly after 9 p.m. on election night. The investigation into the crash determined the twin-engine plane broke a crankshaft in the left engine. The plane veered to the left and crashed rapidly into a soybean field, where it exploded on impact, burning all victims beyond recognition. The NTSB reported that the pilot did not retract the wheels when the engine cut off and that this contributed to the sudden loss of control. The report said the plane had been airborne for only 19 seconds before striking the ground. The plane was owned by Rupp Automotive, which was the car parts store owned by Rupp.

The State Democratic Committee held a vote on a new nominee on August 21 and Hearnes defeated Missouri State Treasurer Jim Spainhower, garnering 63.3% of the vote. Hearnes lost the general election to Missouri Attorney General John Danforth, who garnered 56.93% of the vote.

A museum of Litton memorabilia was made in the Jerry L. Litton Visitor Center near the dam at Smithville Lake in Smithville, Missouri.

See also
 List of United States Congress members who died in office (1950–99)

References

External links
Death of Missouri Winner Roils Democratic Politics
More on Congressman Litton
Congressional biography
 
 Litton Center, Smithville, MO

|-

1937 births
1976 deaths
Victims of aviation accidents or incidents in 1976
Victims of aviation accidents or incidents in the United States
University of Missouri alumni
Ranchers from Missouri
People from Daviess County, Missouri
Accidental deaths in Missouri
Democratic Party members of the United States House of Representatives from Missouri
20th-century American politicians
People from Chillicothe, Missouri